The Other Me is a 2022 American drama and mystery film directed by Giga Agladze, in his directorial debut in feature films. David Lynch served as the executive producer. The film was shot in Georgia. The film received mixed reviews.

Plot 
Irakli is diagnosed with a rare eye disease that allows him to see people's true motives. He then meets a mysterious woman who helps him to find his true identity.

Cast

Critical reception
The Other Me has an approval rating of 45% based on 11 professional reviews on the review aggregator website Rotten Tomatoes. In his Variety review of the film, Dennis Harvey criticized the movie for its lack of real-world logic, poorly developed subplots, failure to portray Sturgess' character as a 'frustrated great artist' as presumed. He noted that Pejic was "out of depth playing the kind of cipher role that might easily flummox a more practiced performer" and the film's low-quality widescreen images which are edited as a patchwork. He also noted that the film's story was full of aimless detours with deliberate misdirection before it reached the end towards its supposed central theme of gender dysphoria. He opined that undeveloped ideas came packaged in abstract images and bold editorial gambits.

In AIPTcomics review, Nathaniel Muir says that "[d]espite its seemingly simple premise, there is a lot to The Other Me. This includes an overabundance of characters and some subplots that mean little to the overall plot. At its core, there is a fascinating tale about discovery, but there is a lot of going happening around the edges, also. The story encourages repeat viewings; it is unfortunate the movie does not." He also noted that the film was composed with a touch of sexuality, which was felt throughout the plot, which might not be necessarily required for the story.

References

External links 
 

Films scored by Paul Haslinger
2020s mystery drama films
American mystery drama films
2022 films
2020s English-language films